Binner is a surname. Notable people with the surname include:

Hermes Binner (born 1943), Argentine politician
Walther Binner (1891–1971), German freestyle swimmer

See also
 Binner, nickname of Josh Binstock (born 1981), Canadian volleyball player